Ōi may refer to:

Japanese geography
 Ōi, Fukui
 Ōi, Kanagawa
 Ōi, Saitama
 Ōi District, Fukui
 Ōi River, Shizuoka Prefecture
  Ōi River (Kyoto Prefecture), part of the Katsura River

People with the surname
 Katsushika Ōi (c. 1800 – 1866), Japanese ukiyo-e artist
, Japanese pool player

Other uses
 Ōi (shogi), one of the eight titles of Japanese professional shogi (board game) tournament
 Ōi Dam, Gifu Prefecture, Japan
 Japanese cruiser Ōi, a former cruiser in the Imperial Japanese Navy

See also 
 Ooi – In some romanizations, ōi is sometimes written as ooi
 Oi (disambiguation)

Japanese-language surnames